Weddicar is a civil parish in the Borough of Copeland, Cumbria, England. It contains two listed buildings that are recorded in the National Heritage List for England. Of these, one is listed at Grade II*, the middle of the three grades, and the other is at Grade II, the lowest grade.  The parish is to the southeast of the town of Whitehaven, and is mainly rural.  Both listed buildings originated as farmhouses.


Key

Buildings

References

Citations

Sources

Lists of listed buildings in Cumbria